Yohan Montès (born 7 February 1985) is a French rugby union player. His position is Prop. He began his career with Stade Français before moving to Stade Toulousain in 2007. He currently plays in the Fédérale 1, the third tier of French rugby, for his home town Beauvais Rugby.

Barbarians 
In March 2009, he was invited with the French Barbarians to play a match against the president's XV, a selection of foreign players playing in France, at the Ernest-Wallon stadium in Toulouse2. The Baa-Baas lost 26 to 333. In November 2012, he played with the French Barbarians against Japan at the Océane stadium in Le Havre4. The Baa-Baas won 65 to 41. In November 2014, he was again selected to the French Barbarians team to face Namibia at the Mayol stadium in Toulon5. The Baa-Baas won 35-14.

Honours
Top 14 Champion – 2006–07, 2010–11, 2011–12
Heineken Cup Champion – 2009–10

References

1985 births
Living people
French rugby union players
Sportspeople from Beauvais
Stade Toulousain players
Rugby union props
Rugby union hookers